Captain Midnight is a 1942 American serial film. It was Columbia Pictures 17th released serial and was based upon the radio adventure serial of the same name, broadcast from 1938 to 1949. Captain Midnight was only one of the many aviation serials released during World War II, whose leading characters were derived from early pulp magazines and radio show favorites.

Plot
Captain Albright is an extremely skilled aviator, better known by his alter ego as Captain Midnight. He is assigned to neutralize the sinister Ivan Shark, an evil enemy scientist who is aerial bombing major American cities with his unmarked aircraft. Captain Midnight leads the Secret Squadron, whose staff includes Chuck Ramsay, Midnight's ward, and Ichabod 'Icky' Mudd, the Squadron's chief mechanic. Shark has developed a highly efficient mercenary organization. He is aided by his daughter, Fury, his highly intelligent second in command, and Gardo the henchman, and Fang, an Asian ally. Shark is after a new aviation range finder invented by the altruistic scientist, John Edwards, whose beautiful daughter, Joyce, they attempt to capture in order to blackmail the patriotic inventor. Captain Midnight and the Secret Squadron continually battle the henchmen, thwarting Shark's evil plans, while avoiding destruction at every turn by making daring escapes during the serial's 15 weekly chapters.

Cast
 Dave O'Brien as Captain Albright / Captain Midnight
 Dorothy Short as Joyce Edwards
 James Craven as Ivan Shark
 Sam Edwards as Chuck Ramsey
 Guy Wilkerson as Ichabod 'Icky' Mudd
 Bryant Washburn as John Edwards
 Luana Walters as Fury Shark
 Joe Girard as Major Steel (as Joe Girard)
 Ray Teal as Borgman - Henchman #8
 George Pembroke as Dr. James Jordan
 Chuck Hamilton as Martel, Henchman #7 (as Charles Hamilton)
 Al Ferguson as Gardo- Henchman #5

Chapter titles
 Mysterious Pilot
 The Stolen Range Finder
 The Captured Plane
 Mistaken Identity
 Ambushed Ambulance
 Weird Waters
 Menacing Fates
 Shells of Evil
 The Drop to Doom
 The Hidden Bomb
 Sky Terror
 Burning Bomber
 Death in the Cockpit
 Scourge of Revenge
 The Fatal Hour
Source:

Release
The serial was released in Latin America in November 1942, under the title El Capitán Medianoche, and was shown in English with Spanish subtitles.

See also
List of film serials by year
List of film serials by studio

References

External links
AllMovie.com
Cinefania.com
eMoviePoster.com 

1942 films
1940s English-language films
American black-and-white films
Columbia Pictures film serials
American aviation films
Films directed by James W. Horne
1942 adventure films
American adventure films
Films with screenplays by George H. Plympton
Films based on radio series
1940s American films